Arcadia (3 April 400 – 444) was the third daughter of the Roman emperor Arcadius and Aelia Eudoxia and a member of the Theodosian dynasty.

Life
Her next sibling was the male heir and future emperor Theodosius II. Following the example of her older sister Aelia Pulcheria she took a vow of virginity, but unlike her, she never married, devoting herself to religion. Arcadia died in 444.

Constructions 
In Constantinople, she ordered the construction, near the Gate of Saturninus, of a monastery dedicated to Saint Andrew. The building, named also Rodophylion lay about 600 m. west of the gate. Heavily transformed, the church of the monastery is now the Koca Mustafa Pasha Mosque of Istanbul. Arcadia built two mansions and possibly a bath in Constantinople.

References

Sources
 «Arcadia 1», PLRE I, p. 129.

400 births
444 deaths
5th-century Byzantine people
5th-century women
Theodosian dynasty
Daughters of Byzantine emperors